Gappa Valley is a beautiful tourist spot in the Nagar District, Gilgit-Baltistan, Pakistan. Gappa valley always with its natural jungles, fountain, grasslands, and mesmerizing view of Rakaposhi, attracts the nature-loving tourist. The best route to visit Gappa Valley is a way through a Chahlat Bala. From the main Karakoram Highway, It takes close to one and half hours to reach Gappa valley via Chalt.

See also
Nagar Valley
Hoper Valley
Hispar

References

Geography of Gilgit-Baltistan
Nagar District